Terelabrus is a genus of fish in the family Labridae found in the Indian and Pacific Ocean.

Species
There are currently 4 recognized species in this genus:
 Terelabrus dewapyle Y. Fukui & Motomura, 2015 (Yellow-striped hogfish)  
 Terelabrus flavocephalus Y. Fukui & Motomura, 2016 (Red-lined hogfish) 
 Terelabrus rubrovittatus J. E. Randall & Fourmanoir, 1998 (White-striped hogfish)
 Terelabrus zonalis Y. Fukui, 2018

References

Labridae
Marine fish genera
Taxa named by John Ernest Randall
Taxa named by Pierre Fourmanoir